Vlahina or Vlaina, meaning "Vlach Mountain" is a mountain range on the border of southwestern Bulgaria and eastern North Macedonia.

The highest peak is Ogreyak (also known as Kadiytsa) at 1,924 m. Nearby towns include Simitli to the northeast in Bulgaria and Pehčevo to the southwest in North Macedonia.

Mountain ranges of Bulgaria
Mountain ranges of North Macedonia
Landforms of Blagoevgrad Province
Bulgaria–North Macedonia border
International mountains of Europe
Pehčevo Municipality
Rhodope mountain range